The Centre national de formation des Scouts et Guides de France (National Training Centre of the Scouts and Guides of France) is located in Jambville, France. Each year, more than 2,000 people attend the courses. With 27 meeting rooms, 200 beds in rooms or dormitories and a dining hall with 400 seats, the center has the necessary infrastructure to accommodate many people.

The garden of the castle, built in the 18th century, covers nearly 52 hectares, half meadow and half forest. Every two years, it hosts the meeting of the young Christians of Île-de-France, the FRAT.

History
In 1952, the Chateau de Jambville was purchased by the Scouts de France after the new owners of castle of Chamarande, the previous training center, decided not to rent their castle to the Scouts any longer.

Events
 Every two years (odd years), the castle hosts the FRAT (12,000 young people).
 In 1952, national days of the Scouts de France.
 In 1975, the first national jamboree of the Guides de France (Pari 75).
 In 1975, the first national jamboree of Scouts de France (Aujourd'hui construisons demain - Today we are building tomorrow.).
 In 1983, national days of Scouts de France where the Scouts de France's charter was proclaimed.
 In 1989, national camp of Scoutisme Français for the preparation of the World Scout Conference in 1990.
 In 1991, national jamboree of Scouts de France (Terres d'aventures - Land of adventure).
 In 1997, national jamboree of Scouts de France (Choisis ta vie! - Choose your life).
 In 2006, the first national meeting of Scouts et Guides de France (Paroles de liberté, paroles d'avenir - Words of freedom, Words of future).
 In 2006, the first national jamboree of Scouts et Guides de France (Quels talents! - What talents!).
 In 2011, national meeting of Scouts et Guides de France.
 In 2012, national jamboree of Scouts et Guides de France (Vis tes rêves - Live your dreams).
 In 2016, European camp of World Scout Movement & World Association of Girl Guides and Girl Scouts. Roverway 2016 ("#SurLaRoute" - #OnTheRoad)

See also
 Scouts et Guides de France

External links
 Official Website of the center
 French Scouting Wiki page on Jambville

Scouting and Guiding in France